River of Time is a Jorma Kaukonen studio album released in 2009 and his 2nd on Red House Records.  The album reached #21 on the Billboard "Top Heatseekers" chart, and has received generally favorable reviews.  All new recordings make up the album with a combination of songs that had been previously recorded by Hot Tuna, covers, and new compositions.  The album was recorded at Levon Helm's studio, and Helm plays drums on some of the tracks. The title song "River of Time" won the Folk Song of the Year Award.

Track listing
"Been So Long" (Jorma Kaukonen) – 3:58
"There's a Bright Side Somewhere" (Rev. Gary Davis) – 3:01
"Cracks in the Finish" (Kaukonen) – 3:30
"Another Man Done a Full Go Round" (Roy Book Binder) – 3:39
"Trouble In Mind" (Traditional) – 3:25
"Izze's Lullaby" (Kaukonen) – 3:32
"More Than My Old Guitar" (Merle Haggard) – 3:45
"Nashville Blues" (Alton Delmore, Raybon Delmore) – 3:23
"A Walk with Friends" (Kaukonen, Barry Mitterhoff, Larry Campbell) – 4:33
"Operator" (Ron McKernan) – 3:48
"Preachin on the Old Camp Ground" (Mississippi John Hurt) – 3:48
"River of Time" (Kaukonen) – 2:56
"Simpler Than I Thought" (Kaukonen) – 6:10

Personnel
Jorma Kaukonen – guitars, vocals
Larry Campbell – guitar, baritone guitar, tenor guitar, resophonic guitar, fiddle, dobro, mandolin, cittern, percussion
Barry Mitterhoff – banjo, mandolin, tenor guitar
Lincoln Schleifer – bass
Levon Helm – drums on "Cracks in the Finish" and "Trouble in Mind"
Teresa Williams – vocals on "More Than My Old Guitar", "Nashville Blues" and "Preachin' on the Old Camp Ground"
Myron Hart – bass on "More Than My Old Guitar" and "Nashville Blues", vocals on "Preachin' on the Old Camp Ground"
Justin Guip – drums on "More Than My Old Guitar", "Nashville Blues", and "Operator"

Production
Larry Campbell – producer
Justin Guip – engineer
David Glasser – mastering
Recorded and mixed at Levon Helm Studio, Woodstock, NY
Scott Hall – cover photography
James Russick Smith – studio photography
Kevin Morgan Studio – art, design

Notes

References

2009 albums
Albums produced by Larry Campbell (musician)
Jorma Kaukonen albums
Red House Records albums